The 2016–17 North Carolina Tar Heels men's basketball team represented the University of North Carolina at Chapel Hill during the 2016–17 NCAA Division I men's basketball season. It was head coach Roy Williams' 14th season. The Tar Heels played their home games at the Dean Smith Center as members of the Atlantic Coast Conference. In 2017, they earned their 6th NCAA National Championship by defeating Gonzaga in the championship game.

Previous season

The Tar Heels finished the 2015–16 season with a record of 33–7, 14–4 in ACC play to finish in first place, winning their 30th ACC regular season title. The Tar Heels also won their 18th ACC tournament championship by beating Virginia in the finals 61–57. They received the conference's automatic bid to the NCAA tournament as a No. 1 seed. There, they defeated Florida Gulf Coast, Providence, Indiana, and Notre Dame to earn a trip to the Final Four, the school's 19th Final Four. In a matchup against fellow ACC foe, Syracuse, the Tar Heels easily won 83–66 to advance to the National Championship against Villanova. Despite a circus shot by Marcus Paige to tie the game at 74 with less than five seconds remaining, the Tar Heels lost on a three pointer as time expired.

Departures

2016 recruiting class

Roster

Schedule and results

|-
!colspan=12 style=| Exhibition

|-
!colspan=12 style=| Non-conference regular season

|-
!colspan=12 style=| ACC Regular Season

|-
!colspan=12 style=| ACC Tournament

|-
!colspan=12 style=| NCAA tournament

Rankings

*AP does not release post-NCAA Tournament rankings

Players drafted into the NBA

References

External links
2016–17 North Carolina Tar Heels men's basketball team schedule

North Carolina
North Carolina Tar Heels men's basketball seasons
North Carolina
NCAA Division I men's basketball tournament Final Four seasons
NCAA Division I men's basketball tournament championship seasons
Tar
Tar